Tahuna may refer to the following places:

New Zealand
Tahuna, Otago, a suburb of Dunedin
Tahuna, Waikato
Queenstown, New Zealand (Māori: Tāhuna)
Tāhunanui, a suburb of Nelson sometimes referred to as Tahuna

Elsewhere
Tahuna, North Sulawesi, Indonesia
Tahuna F.C., a football club

See also

Tahuneh (disambiguation)
Tāhunanui, a suburb of Nelson, New Zealand